The Grand Design is the fifth studio album by symphonic metal band Edenbridge.

Reception

The album received mixed professional reviews. The German edition of Metal Hammer as well as Rock Hard wrote that the songs varied between melodic metal and kitsch. Metal Hammer's reviewer observed, however, that singer Sabine Edelsbacher could match the timbre of Tarja Turunen. Also About.com compared Edelsbacher's singing to Nightwish but called the overall style of the album symphonic progressive metal.

Track listing

Credits

Musicians

Edenbridge
Sabine Edelsbacher - vocals
Lanvall - guitar, keyboards
Roland Navratil - drums
Frank Bindig - bass guitar

Guest musicians
Robby Valentine
Dennis Ward
Karl Groom
Martin Mayr
Astrid Stockhammer

Production
Karl Groom, mixing and recording

References

2007 albums
Edenbridge (band) albums
Massacre Records albums